Statistics of Empress's Cup in the 2001 season.

Overview
It was contested by 20 teams, and Iga FC Kunoichi won the championship.

Results

1st round
Fujimi FC Angels 1-2 Hokkaido Bunkyo University Meisei High School
Ohara Gakuen JaSRA 2-1 Tokyo Women's College of Physical Education
Saibi High School 0-6 Kyoto Shiko SC
Fukuoka Jogakuin FC Anclas 1-3 Seiwa Gakuen High School

2nd round
Nippon TV Beleza 12-0 Hokkaido Bunkyo University Meisei High School
JEF United Ichihara 1-2 Takarazuka Bunnys
Urawa Reinas FC 5-0 Hiroshima Minami High School
Ohara Gakuen JaSRA 0-6 Iga FC Kunoichi
YKK Tohoku LSC Flappers 3-0 Kyoto Shiko SC
AS Elfen FC 0-3 Shimizudaihachi SC
Speranza FC Takatsuki 4-0 Renaissance Kumamoto FC
Seiwa Gakuen High School 0-10 Tasaki Perule FC

Quarterfinals
Nippon TV Beleza 4-0 Takarazuka Bunnys
Urawa Reinas FC 0-1 Iga FC Kunoichi
YKK Tohoku LSC Flappers 4-1 Shimizudaihachi SC
Speranza FC Takatsuki 0-3 Tasaki Perule FC

Semifinals
Nippon TV Beleza 1-2 Iga FC Kunoichi
YKK Tohoku LSC Flappers 1-3 Tasaki Perule FC

Final
Iga FC Kunoichi 2-1 Tasaki Perule FC
Iga FC Kunoichi won the championship.

References

Empress's Cup
2001 in Japanese women's football